The events of 1960 in anime.

Releases

Births
 May 22 - Hideaki Anno, animator, director, artist, screenwriter, actor (Neon Genesis Evangelion).
 October 2 - Shinji Aramaki, director, mechanical designer.
 November 28 - Mitsuo Fukuda, director.

See also
1960 in animation

External links 
Japanese animated works of the year, listed in the IMDb

Anime
Anime
Years in anime